Arkit may refer to:
 ARKit, an iOS developer API
 Arkit, Republic of Dagestan, Russia
 Arkyt, Kyrgyzstan